Arhopala agelastus  is a species of butterfly belong to the lycaenid family described by William Chapman Hewitson in 1862. It is found in Southeast Asia (Peninsular Malaya, Langkawi, Singapore and ssp. perissa  Doherty, 1889 Burma, Mergui and Thailand)

Subspecies
Arhopala agelastus agelastus (Peninsular Malaysia, Langkawi, Singapore)
Arhopala agelastus perissa Doherty, 1889 (southern Burma, Mergui, southern Thailand)

References

External links
"Arhopala Boisduval, 1832" at Markku Savela's Lepidoptera and Some Other Life Forms. Retrieved June 7, 2017.

Arhopala
Butterflies described in 1862
Butterflies of Asia
Taxa named by William Chapman Hewitson